Joaquin Reyes Chávez (born 20 February 1978 in Torreón; birthdate alternatively shown as 13 August 1979) is a Mexican former footballer who last played for Celaya.

He made his debut on 20 July 2000 for Santos Laguna in a game against Puebla FC. He has played for Santos and Tiburones Rojos de Veracruz in the Primera Division de Mexico.

Reyes earned 6 caps for Mexico, playing in the 2001 FIFA Confederations Cup and the 2002 CONCACAF Gold Cup.

References

External links
 

1978 births
Living people
Mexico international footballers
Association football defenders
2001 FIFA Confederations Cup players
2002 CONCACAF Gold Cup players
Liga MX players
Real Sociedad de Zacatecas footballers
Santos Laguna footballers
C.D. Veracruz footballers
Club Puebla players
Club León footballers
Footballers from Coahuila
Mexican footballers
Sportspeople from Torreón